The Cymru Premier League Cup, currently known as the Nathaniel MG Cup for sponsorship reasons, is a cup competition in Welsh football organised by the Cymru Premier.

The competition was established in 1992 and is considered to be the second-most important domestic cup competition for Welsh football clubs, after the older and more prestigious Welsh Cup. Unlike the Welsh Cup, where 135 teams entered in 2008–09, the competition is only open to the members of the Cymru Premier, the Cymru North, Cymru South and a very select few other clubs. It should not be confused with the Welsh Football League Cup, which was for the clubs in the Welsh Football League, which despite its name only covered the south and centre of Wales up until it was disbanded at the end of the 2018-19 season.

Format
Since the inaugural season in 1992/93 the format of the competition has changed many times. The 2006/07 season saw the introduction of a new format for the competition. Beginning in August, the eighteen premier league teams are split into six regionalised groups of three teams. The six group winners and two runners-up enter a quarter-final knock-out phase, followed by a two legged semi-final match before ending with the final in April.

The current format, introduced in 2014/15, saw a radical shake up for the competition. The 12 Cymru Premier teams are joined by six teams each from the two feeder leagues, and also four wildcard entrants. 24 teams enter Round 1, with the previous season's four semi-finalists receiving a bye through to Round 2. The draw for each round is regionalized as per competition rules, with teams being divided between northern and southern sections. The format changed slightly for the 2018/19 season, with each round up to the semi-finals being regionalized, and the semis an open draw. The semi-finals will also take place over a weekend for the first time.

From 2019-20 the format was expanded significantly with all 44 teams from the top two tiers of the Welsh football league system taking part as well as two wildcard entries. Twenty-eight clubs will enter in Round 1, which will be made up of any club without floodlights; the two wildcard entries; and the remaining teams ranked lowest in their respective Tier 2 league from the previous season. Round 1 will be regionalised, as will all rounds up to the Semi-Final stage. The fourteen winners will join the eighteen remaining sides in Round 2. This will be seeded so that Premier League sides are not drawn against one another. The winner of the tournament gained entry to the Scottish Challenge Cup.

History
The first Welsh League Cup was won by Afan Lido in 1992/93, who beat Caersws FC 4–3 on penalties, after drawing in the final 1–1.
The New Saints hold the record for the most League Cup titles; they have won the competition six times. Bangor City hold the distinction of making the most number of appearances in the final and losing on every occasion (6).

The cup is currently held by Connah's Quay Nomads, who defeated Cardiff Met 10-9 on penalties after a 0-0 draw.

The New Saints dominated the competition between 2015 and 2018, winning all four finals during that period. Saints have won nine of the ten finals they have appeared in. They have however not made the final since beating Cardiff Met in 2018. 

The 2018–19 final between Cardiff Met and Cambrian & Clydach Vale holds the record attendance in the competition, with 1,503 fans witnessing Met's first major trophy win.

Sponsorship
Since 2003, the League Cup has been named after its sponsor, giving it the following name:
 Loosemores League Cup (2003 to 2012), sponsored by Loosemores Solicitors (Cardiff)
 The Word Cup (2012 to 2016), sponsored by theWord, a Cardiff-based telecommunications provider.
 Nathaniel MG Cup (2016 to present), sponsored by Nathaniel MG Cars, a car sales company based in Bridgend and Cardiff.

Prize money
The total prize fund for the competition is £15,000. The league awards £1,000 to each losing semi-finalist, £3,000 to the runner-up and £10,000 to the competition winners.

Past winners
Correct as of 6 February 2021.

Results by team

Notes:
The New Saints total includes wins under previous names: Total Network Solutions and Llansantffraid.

See also
Football in Wales
Welsh football league system
Welsh Cup
FAW Premier Cup
List of football clubs in Wales
List of stadiums in Wales by capacity

References

External links
Official League Cup Website
Welsh-Premier.com Loosemores League Cup

 
2
Wales
Cymru Premier
Recurring sporting events established in 1992
1992 establishments in Wales